Ricardo Ferreira Berna (born 11 June 1979 in São Paulo), known as Ricardo Berna, is a Brazilian footballer who plays as a goalkeeper for Portuguesa.

Honours
América Mineiro
Copa Sul-Minas: 2000
Campeonato Mineiro: 2001

Fluminense
Copa do Brasil: 2007
Campeonato Brasileiro Série A: 2010, 2012
Campeonato Carioca: 2012
Taça Guanabara: 2012

Fortaleza
Campeonato Cearense: 2016

References

External links
Canal Fluminense 

1979 births
Living people
Brazilian footballers
Association football goalkeepers
Campeonato Brasileiro Série A players
Campeonato Brasileiro Série B players
Campeonato Brasileiro Série C players
Vegalta Sendai players
Guarani FC players
América Futebol Clube (MG) players
União São João Esporte Clube players
Associação Portuguesa de Desportos players
Fluminense FC players
Clube Náutico Capibaribe players
Macaé Esporte Futebol Clube players
Fortaleza Esporte Clube players
Footballers from São Paulo